Miss Distrito Federal, formerly called Miss Brasília, is a Brazilian Beauty pageant which selects the representative for the Brazilian Federal District at the Miss Brazil contest. The pageant was created in 1959 and has been held every year since with the exception of 1990–1991, 1993, and 2020. The pageant is held annually with representation of several municipalities. Since 2019, the State director of Miss Distrito Federal is, Mayck Carvalho.

Miss Distrito Federal has only one Miss Brazil national crown:
Jacqueline Ribeiro Meirelles, in 1987

Gallery of Titleholders

Results Summary

Placements
Miss Brazil: Jacqueline Ribeiro Meirelles (1987)
1st Runner-Up:  (1960); Lisane Távora (1975)
2nd Runner-Up: Mariza Sommer (1974);  (1976); Patrícia Viotti de Andrade (1977); Loiane Rogéria Aiache (1980); Karin Keller Lins (1981); Denise Ribeiro Aliceral (2009)
3rd Runner-Up: Denise Almeida (1963); Anísia Fonsêca (1967); Tanara Bier (1978); Lidiane de Lucena Matos (2010)
4th Runner-Up: 
Top 5/Top 8/Top 9: Pilar Matos Ferro (1968); Marice Galvão (1969); Stella Dlugolenski (1971); Kátia Lopes (1973); Niriam Massi (1979); Tamiris Rodrigues Aguiar (2012)
Top 10/Top 11/Top 12: Lígia Romagnoli (1982); Vera Lúcia Petit (1984); Helayne Cardoso (1985); Patrícia Carneiro (1986); Barbara Kelly Cezar Fonseca (1999); Ana Cláudia Sandoval Pimenta (2006); Alessandra Gomes Faria Baldini (2011); Luísa Lopes (2014)
Top 15/Top 16: Ludmylla Costa Basthos (2008); Amanda Balbino (2015); Biah Rodrigues (2018); Ana Gabriela Borges (2019); Gabriela Rodrigues (2021)

Special Awards
Miss Congeniality: Patrícia Viotti de Andrade (1977); Loiane Rogéria Aiache (1980)
Miss Be Emotion: Amanda Balbino (2015)
Miss Popular Vote: Ana Cláudia Sandoval Pimenta (2006)
Best State Costume: Niriam Massi (1979); Ludmylla Costa Basthos (2008)

Titleholders

Miss Distrito Federal
Since 2002, the pageant title has been Miss Distrito Federal.

Miss Brasília
From 1959 to 2001, the title was called Miss Brasília. In 1981, the District started to competed as Miss Distrito Federal at Miss Brazil but was still crowned under the Miss Brasília banner/title and the contest remained being called Miss Brasília until 2002.

Table Notes

References

External links
Official Miss Brasil Website

Women in Brazil
Distrito Federal
Miss Brazil state pageants